Danescourt railway station is a railway station serving the Danescourt suburb of Cardiff, Wales.

The City Line was freight only from its opening (in 1859) until 1987, when British Rail introduced a passenger service between Cardiff Central and Radyr. Some non-stop passenger trains pass through in both directions.

Both of the station's two platforms are accessible for disabled passengers via ramps. The Cardiff Central-bound platform is accessible via a bridge, whilst the Radyr-bound platform is accessible via a residential road (Beale Close) off the main road (Danescourt Way). A footbridge links the two platforms.

Services
The typical Monday-Saturday off-peak service is:

Journey times from Danescourt are 12 minutes to Cardiff Central and seven minutes to Radyr. There is no Sunday service.

See also
List of railway stations in Cardiff
Rail transport in Cardiff

References

External links

Railway stations in Cardiff
DfT Category F2 stations
Railway stations opened by British Rail
Railway stations in Great Britain opened in 1987
Railway stations served by Transport for Wales Rail